Peter E. Perry (June 22, 1901 – May 17, 1993) was a Democratic member of the Pennsylvania House of Representatives.

During his tenure as a representative, Perry served as the Chairman of the State Government Committee.

References

Democratic Party members of the Pennsylvania House of Representatives
1901 births
1993 deaths
20th-century American politicians